Paul Armand Silvestre (18 April 1837 – 19 February 1901) was a 19th-century French poet and conteur born in Paris.

He studied at the École polytechnique with the intention of entering the army, but in 1870 he entered the department of finance. Silvestre had a successful official career, was decorated with the Legion of Honour in 1886, and in 1892 was made inspector of fine arts. Armand Silvestre made his entry into literature as a poet, and was reckoned among the Parnassians.

Works 
Armand Silvestre's works were published mainly by Alphonse Lemerre and Gervais Charpentier.

Some of his poems were set to music by Gabriel Fauré, under the form of mélodies for one voice and piano (Le Secret, L'Automne...). Thirteen of his poems were set by André Messager. Silvestre's poem Jours Passés was set in music by Léo Delibes under the title Regrets.

Poetry 
Rimes neuves et vieilles, with a preface by George Sand (1866) see on Gallica 
Les Renaissances (1870)
La Gloire du souvenir, poème d'amour (1872)
Poésies, 1866-1874. Les Amours. La Vie. L'Amour (1875)
La Chanson des heures, poésies nouvelles (1874-1878) (1878)
Le Pays des roses, poésies nouvelles, 1880-1882 (1882)
Le Chemin des étoiles : les Adorations, la Chanson des jours, Musiques d'amour, Dernières tendresses, Poèmes dialogués, 1882-1885 (1885)
Le Dessus du panier : Impressions et souvenirs, Soleils toulousains, Propos de saison, Au pays des rêves (1885)
Poésies, 1872-1878. La Chanson des heures (1887)
Les Ailes d'or, poésies nouvelles (1890)
Roses d'octobre, poésies, 1884-1889 (1890)
Poésies, 1866-1872. Rimes neuves et vieilles. Les Renaissances. La Gloire du souvenir (1892)
L'Or des couchants, poésies nouvelles, 1889-1892 (1892))
Trente Sonnets pour Mademoiselle Bartet (1896)
Les Aurores lointaines, poésies nouvelles, 1892-1895 (1896)
Les Tendresses, poésies nouvelles, 1895-1898 (1898)
Les Fleurs d'hiver, poésies nouvelles, 1898-1900 (1900)
His volumes of verse include:
Rimes neuves et vieilles (1866), to which George Sand wrote a preface
Les Renaissances (1870)
La Chanson des heures (1878)
Le Chemin des étoiles (1885), etc.

The poet was also a contributor to Gil Blas and other Parisian journals, distinguishing himself by the licence he permitted himself. To these "absences" from poetry, as Henri Chantavoine calls them, belong the seven volumes of La Vie pour rire (1881–1883), Contes pantagruéliques et galants (1884), Le Livre des joyeusetés (1884), Gauloiseries nouvelles (1888), &c.

Prose 

Les Farces de mon ami Jacques (1881)
Les Mémoires d'un galopin, suivis de Petite Histoire naturelle (1882)
Le Péché d'Ève (1882)
Le Filleul du docteur Trousse-Cadet, suivi des Nouveaux Malheurs du commandant Laripète (1882) see on Gallica 
Histoires belles et honnestes (1883) see on Gallica 
Madame Dandin et mademoiselle Phryné (1883)
Contes grassouillets (1883)
Les Mélancolies d'un joyeux (1883) see on Gallica 
Chroniques du temps passé. Le Conte de l'archer (1883)
Pour faire rire. Gauloiseries contemporaines (1883)
Contes pantagruéliques et galants (1884)
En pleine fantaisie (1884)
Les Bêtises de mon oncle (1884)
Le Livre des joyeusetés (1884)
Histoires de l'autre monde : mœurs américaines (1884)
Le Falot (1884)
Contes à la comtesse (1885)
Les Merveilleux Récits de l'amiral Le Kelpudubec (1885)
Joyeusetés galantes, suivies de Laripète citadin (1885)
Les Cas difficiles (1886) see on Gallica 
Contes de derrière les fagots (1886) illustrated by Félix Lacaille
Les Veillées de Saint-Pantaléon (1886)
Histoires inconvenantes (1887)
Le Livre des fantaisies. Joyeusetés et mélancolies (1887)
Au fil du rire (1888)
Histoires joyeuses (1888) see on Gallica 
Fabliaux gaillards (1888) see on Gallica 
Joyeux devis (1888)
Maïma (1888) see on Gallica 
Gauloiseries nouvelles (1888) see on Gallica 
Propos grivois (1888) see on Gallica 
Rose de mai, roman (1888) see on Gallica 
Le Nu au Salon (5 volumes, 1888-1892)
Contes à la brune (1889) see on Gallica 
Histoires scandaleuses (1889)
Un premier amant (1889) see on Gallica 
Livre d'amour (1890) see on Gallica 
Les Facéties de Cadet-Bitard (1890)
Qui lira rira (1890) see on Gallica 
Trente bonnes farces (1890)
Le Célèbre Cadet-Bitard (1891) see on Gallica 
Les Malheurs du commandant Laripète, suivis de : Les Mariages de Jacques (1891)
L'Épouvantail des rosières (1891) see on Gallica 
Contes salés (1891)
Histoires joviales (1891)
L'Effroi des bégueules (1891) see on Gallica 
Floréal (1891)
Portraits et souvenirs, 1886-1891 (1891)
Histoires extravagantes (1892)
Pour les amants (1892)
Au pays des souvenirs : mes maîtres et mes maîtresses (1892)
Aventures grassouillettes (1892)
Contes audacieux (1892) see on Gallica 
Contes divertissants (1892)
Nouveaux contes incongrus (1892)
La Russie, impressions, portraits, paysages (1892)
Contes hilarants (1893)
Histoires réjouissantes (1893)
Amours folâtres (1893)
Facéties galantes, contes joyeux (1893)
Histoires abracadabrantes (1893)
Contes désopilants (1893)
Procès Rousseil-Tessandier et biographie de Mlle Rousseil (1893)
La Semaine pour rire (152 fascicules, 1893-1896)
La Kosake (1894)
Fantaisies galantes (1894)
Veillées joviales (1894)
Fariboles amusantes (1895)
Histoires gaies (1895)
Nouvelles gaudrioles (1895) see on Gallica 
Le Passe-temps des farceurs (1895)
La Plante enchantée (1895)
Contes au gros sel (1896)
Contes irrévérencieux (1896) see on Gallica 
Récits de belle humeur (1896) see on Gallica 
Les Veillées galantes (1896)
La Semaine joyeuse, (85 fascicules, 1896-1898)
Contes tragiques et sentimentaux (1897)
Le Petit art d'aimer, en quatorze chapitres (1897)
Histoires gauloises (1898)
Belles histoires d'amour (1898)
Les Fleurs amoureuses (1899)
Arlette, roman (1900)
Guide Armand Silvestre, de Paris et de ses environs et de l'Exposition de 1900 (1900)
La Chemise à travers les âges, album (1900)
Images de femmes (1901)
Orfa, roman (1901)
Les Sept Péchés capitaux. La luxure (1901) see on Gallica 
Les Dessous de la femme à travers les âges, album (1902)
Contes incongrus (1902)
Bibliothèque des Aventures gauloises (1902)

Theatre and librettos 
1876: Dimitri, opera in 5 acts and 7 tableaux, with Henri de Bornier, music by Victorin de Joncières, Paris, théâtre National-Lyrique, 1 May
1879: Monsieur ? three-act comédie-bouffe, with Paul Burani, Athénée-Comique, 24 October
1879: Myrrha, saynète romaine, Paris, Cercle des arts libéraux, 20 December
1880: La Tempête, poème symphonique in 3 parts, after Shakespeare, with Pierre Berton, music byAlphonse Duvernoy, Théâtre du Châtelet, 18 November
1882: Coquelicot, three-act opéra comique, after the Cogniard brothers, music by Louis Varney, Théâtre des Bouffes-Parisiens, 2 March
1882: Galante aventure, three-act opéra comique, with Louis Davyl, music by Ernest Guiraud, Opéra-Comique, 23 March
1883: Henry VIII, opera in 4 acts and 6 tableaux, with Léonce Détroyat, music by Camille Saint-Saëns, Opéra, 5 March
1884: Pedro de Zalamea, four-act opera, with Léonce Détroyat, music by Benjamin Godard, Anvers, théâtre Royal, 31 January
1886: Les Templiers, opera in 5 acts and 7 tableaux, with Jules Adenis and Lionel Bonnemère, music by Henry Litolff, Bruxelles, théâtre de la Monnaie, 25 January
1886: Le Mari d'un jour, three-act opéra comique, with Adolphe d'Ennery, music by Arthur Coquard, Opéra-Comique, 4 February 
1887: La Tesi, four-act drama, with Georges Maillard, Bruxelles, Théâtre Molière, 29 October; directed by Paul Alhaiza (source: journal le globe illustré)
1888: Jocelyn, four-act opera, after the poem by Lamartine, with Victor Capoul, music by Benjamin Godard, Bruxelles, Théâtre de la Monnaie, February
1888: Chassé-croisé d'amour, one-act opéra-bouffe, with Édouard Cavailhon, music by Villebichot
1888: La Femme bookmaker, obne-act opérette, with Édouard Cavailhon, music by Germain Laurens
1889: Sapho, February
1890: Le Pilote, opera in 3 acts and 4 tableaux, with A. Gandrey, music by J. Urich, Monte-Carlo, Casino, 29 March
1893: c, drama in 1 act and in verse, Comédie-Française, 6 March
1893: Les Drames sacrés, poème dramatique in 1 prologue and 10 tableaux, in verse, religious pictures after 14th- and 15th-century Italian painters, with music by Gounod with Eugène Morand, Théâtre du Vaudeville, 15 March
1894: Izeyl, drame en 4 actes, avec Eugène Morand, musique de Gabriel Pierné, Paris, Théâtre de la Renaissance, 24 January
1894: La Fée du rocher, ballet-pantomime en 2 actes et 6 tableaux, avec Francis Thomé et Jules Chéret, 1894
1895: Salomé, pantomime lyrique, with Meltzer, music by Gabriel Pierné, Théâtre de l'Athénée, 4 March
1897: Tristan de Léonois, drama in 3 acts and 7 tableaux, including 1 prologue, in verse, Comédie-Française, 28 October
1897: Chemin de croix, twelve religious poems after Armand Silvestre, set in music by Alexandre Georges
1899: Messaline, drame lyrique in 4 acts and 5 tableaux, with Eugène Morand, music by Isidore de Lara
1901: Charlotte Corday, drame musical in 3 acts, Opéra Populaire, February
1901: Grisélidis, conte lyrique in 3 acts and 1 prologue, with Eugène Morand, after the le mystery presented at the Comédie-Française, music by Jules Massenet, Opéra-Comique, 13 November
1908: Le Chevalier d'Éon, four-act opéra comique, with Henri Cain, music by Rodolphe Berger, Théâtre de la Porte-Saint-Martin, 10 April
Le Chevalier aux fleurs, ballet-pantomime in 12 tableaux, music by André Messager and Raoul Pugno (s. d.)

An account of his varied and somewhat incongruous production is hardly complete without mention of his art criticism. Le Nu au Salon (1888–1892), in five volumes, with numerous illustrations, was followed by other volumes of the same type. He died at Toulouse, February 19, 1901.

References

External links 

 
 
 
 
 
 Armand Sylvestre on Wikisource

1837 births
1901 deaths
École Polytechnique alumni
19th-century French poets
French opera librettists
French art critics
Writers from Paris
Recipients of the Legion of Honour
19th-century French dramatists and playwrights
Members of the Ligue de la patrie française
French ballet librettists
French male poets
French male dramatists and playwrights
19th-century French male writers
French male non-fiction writers